Lillestrøm is a municipality in Viken county. It is located in the traditional district of Romerike. With a population of 85,757 inhabitants, it is the fourth most populated municipality in Viken. It was founded on 1 January 2020 as a merger between former municipalities Fet, Skedsmo and Sørum. The administrative centre of the municipality is the town of Lillestrøm. The town of Lillestrøm is a part of the Oslo metropolitan area. With 83,821 inhabitants, Lillestrøm is the 4th largest municipality in Viken.

History 

The name means "the little [part of] Strøm", Strøm being the name of an old and large farm (Old Norse: straumr, which also meant "stream" as well).

Lillestrøm's history dates back to the times river powered sawmills came into use for the production of building materials. Later Lillestrøm got its own steam sawmill which laid the base for the development of the area which became the town. The area was, by and large, a moss covered swamp-like area, at the time considered almost uninhabitable. However, the almost non-existent property values were judged to be a fair exchange and so the workers started living and settling in the area around the sawmill, and Lillestrøm was born.
On 1 January 1908 Lillestrøm became a municipality of its own, having been split from Skedsmo. At that time Lillestrøm municipality had a population of 4,351. On 1 January 1962 the two municipalities were reunited under the name Skedsmo. Before the merger Lillestrøm municipality had a population of 10,840.

In 1997, Skedsmo municipal council declared Lillestrøm to be a town (by) in its own right (a purely honorary status which has no effect upon the organization of local government, but is a matter of local pride nonetheless). The event is commemorated in an annual 4-day street fair, which includes music by high-profile Norwegian artists on several outdoor stages, food stalls, retail business exhibitions, and thrill rides. The whole thing (with free admission to all) is held in Lillestrøm's main thoroughfare and its connecting streets, which are closed to all vehicles for the duration.

In 2002, Norway Trade Fairs moved from Skøyen to Lillestrøm.

Transport

Road
Norwegian national road 159 is a four-lane motorway connecting central Lillestrøm directly to Oslo. The European route E6 bypasses Lillestrøm a few kilometres to the west on its way from Oslo to the north of the country. National road 22, running from northwest to southeast, passes through the northern outskirts of the conurbation.

Rail
Lillestrøm is connected to Oslo by two separate railway lines. The Trunk Line (opened 1854) runs to Oslo via the Grorud valley and is used mostly by commuter trains calling at all stations, as well as freight trains. Non-stop commuter trains, airport express trains, and long-distance expresses use the high-speed Gardermoen Line (opened 1999), which runs mostly in tunnel to Oslo.

The Trunk Line north of Lillestrøm carries frequent local passenger trains as far as Dal as well as freight trains to Eidsvoll, Lillehammer, and Trondheim.

The Gardermoen Line (the stretch of which north of Lillestrøm opened in 1998) is used by airport express trains, regional trains to Eidsvoll and Lillehammer, and long-distance passenger services to Trondheim.

Running north-east from Lillestrøm, the Kongsvinger Line (opened 1862) conveys hourly local trains to Kongsvinger as well as a number of longer-distance trains, passenger and freight, to and from Sweden.

Air
However, this is overshadowed by the much larger international airport at Gardermoen (opened 1998), which is  further north but just 12 minutes away from Lillestrøm railway station by high-speed rail.

Education

Lillestrøm is home to the following primary, lower secondary, and upper secondary schools:

Primary

Lower secondary
Asak skole
Bingsfoss ungdomsskole
Bråtejordet skole
Frogner skole
Kjeller skole
Kjellervolla skole
Stav skole
Østersund ungdomsskole

High school
Lillestrøm videregående skole
Skedsmo videregående skole
Strømmen videregående skole
Sørumsand videregående skole

Government
Lillestrøm municipality is controlled by the local Labor party, with Jørgen Vik as the mayor, he has been mayor since the 2020 merger.

The head office of Accident Investigation Board Norway is located in Lillestrøm, and is led by Grete Myhre.

The University College of Norwegian Correctional Service (Kriminalomsorgens høgskole og utdanningssenter, KRUS) is in Lillestrøm.

Facilities
Facilities in Lillestrøm include hotels, Norway trade fairs, a brand new cinema, a mall, Lillestrøm torv, restaurants, a high speed commuter train that reaches both Oslo and Gardermoen airport (the Gardermoen Line), a community cultural house (kulturhus), and a community outdoor swimming pool complex. At Kjeller, just outside the city, there is a military airport (1912) and several research institutes.

Sport
The local football team, Lillestrøm SK, plays in the Norwegian first division. Their home ground is Åråsen Stadion.

The nearby Lillestrøm stadion is used for training, and was an ice hockey venue at the 1952 Winter Olympics. There are also two indoor arenas, one multi-purpose (Skedsmohallen) and one for football (LSK-Hallen), and in 2007 a track and field stadium Romerike Friidrettsstadion was built as a cooperation between the municipalities Skedsmo, Rælingen and Lørenskog.

The local track and field club is named Minerva. Athletes such as Hanne Haugland and Håkon Särnblom have represented the club.

Rugby is represented by newly formed Rugby League club Lillestrøm Lions RLK.

Notable people 

 Claus Wiese (1924–1987) a Norwegian actor and American-based radio broadcaster 
 Ole Edvard Borgen (1925–2009) a Norwegian theologian and Methodist bishop
 Carl Fredrik Lowzow (1927–2009) local and national politician
 Peder Borgen (born 1928) a Norwegian Methodist minister, researches the Dead Sea Scrolls 
 Gerd Grønvold Saue (born 1930) journalist, novelist, hymnwriter and peace activist
 Jan Mangerud (born 1937) geologist, grew up in Lillestrøm
 Arild Andersen (born 1945) a Norwegian jazz bass player, born in Strømmen
 Sasha Gabor (1945–2008) a Hungarian-Norwegian actor and director  
 Ole Kristian Ruud (born 1958) a conductor at the Norwegian Academy of Music
 Anne Holt (born 1958) author, lawyer and politician; grew up in Lillestrøm
 Bjarne Andre Myklebust (born 1972), media professional for NRK
 Chris Holsten (born 1993) a Norwegian singer and songwriter

Sport 

 Tom Lund (born 1950), footballer, 247 club caps with Lillestrøm SK and 47 for Norway
 Kay Stenshjemmet (born 1953), speed skater, two silver medals at the 1980 Winter Olympics
 Erik Solér (born 1960) a former footballer with 39 caps with Norway national football team
 Bjørn Nyland (born 1962) a Norwegian speed skater
 Bente Nordby (born 1974) a former football goalkeeper, with 172 caps with Norway women
 Pål Steffen Andresen (born 1982) footballer with over 320 club caps
 Fredrik Gulbrandsen (born 1992) footballer with over 220 club caps
 Thomas Skoglund (born 1993), handball player, 41 matches with the Norwegian national team

References

External links

Municipality website 
Norwegian Defense Research Establishment
Airport train, "Flytoget"
Lillestrøm torv 
Lillstrøm Sportsclub, LSK 
Lillestrøm cultural centre 
VisitLillestrom.no 

 
Municipalities of Viken (county)
Fet
Skedsmo
Sørum